The 8th season of the FA Women's Premier League. Croydon F.C.'s women's team retained their League title, and added the FA Women's Cup to seal a second double in four years. A 3–0 defeat to Arsenal on 4 May 2000 ended an unbeaten league run stretching back almost two years.

National Division

References
Owl football historian
Womensoccer.com

1999–2000 domestic women's association football leagues
1999
Wom
1